The British Herpetological Society (BHS) is an international herpetological society based in the United Kingdom. The BHS is a non-profit organization with goals to support the conservation, education and captive care of reptiles and amphibians. The society regularly publishes the Herpetological Journal and Herpetological Bulletin on a quarterly basis. It is one of the oldest international herpetological societies and is recognized worldwide for its support in conservation, research and other relevant activities.

History
The society was established in 1947 with the help of Dr Malcolm A. Smith who was a physician who practised in the Royal Court of Siam. Whilst in Siam (present day Thailand), Dr Smith studied the herpetofauna as well as that of south-east Asia. After retiring, he returned to Britain where he developed an interest in the native reptiles and amphibians. This led him founding the society as a way to promote the values he saw fit in regards to the herpetofauna of the British Isles and the wider landscape.

Past Presidents
Past presidents of the British Herpetological Society, listed by retirement date:
 Dr. M. A. Smith (1956)
 Dr. J. F. D. Frazer (1981)
 The Earl of Cranbrook (1990)
 Prof. J. L. Cloudsley-Thompson (1996)
 Dr. R. Avery (1997)
 Dr. H. Robert Bustard (2005)
 Prof. T. J. C. Beebee (2013)
 Prof. R. A. Griffiths (2018)

Publications
The BHS publishes a small number of publications such as:

 Herpetological Journal (formerly British Journal of Herpetology)
 Herpetological Bulletin (formerly The British Herpetological Society Bulletin)
 Natterjack
 British Herpetological Society Reports

References

External links
 Official British Herpetological Society Homepage

Herpetology organizations
Hobbyist organizations
Reptile conservation organizations
Animal charities based in the United Kingdom
Environmental organisations based in the United Kingdom